Silverdale railway station was a railway station that served the village of Silverdale, Staffordshire, England. It was opened by the North Staffordshire Railway in 1863 and closed to passengers in 1964.

In its later years, the station was used by staff operating trains to and from the adjacent colliery. For this purpose, a large rail loader was built.

Present day

Today, only the restored platforms are still in place. The station building has been rebuilt at the Apedale Heritage Centre.

On 21 August 2009, work on Silverdale station platforms was observed with brickwork being repaired or repointed and they have now been restored as part of a railway footpath to Newcastle-U-Lyme.

References

Further reading

Disused railway stations in Staffordshire
Railway stations in Great Britain closed in 1964
Railway stations in Great Britain opened in 1863
Beeching closures in England
Former North Staffordshire Railway stations